Mani is a 2003 Indian Kannada-language romance film written and directed by debutant Yograj Bhat. It features Mayur Patel and Radhika in the lead roles. The supporting cast includes Umashree, Kashi, Avinash, Rangayana Raghu and Karisubbu. The score for the film is by Rajesh Ramanath and soundtrack for the film is by Raja. The film was dubbed in Tamil as Sollattuma.

Cast 

 Mayur Patel as Kummi 
 Radhika as Mani
 Umashree as Shantakka 
 Kashi as Dasanna 
 Avinash
 Rangayana Raghu as Chami 
 Karisubbu
 Anand
 Nagashekar
 Myna Chandru
 Renuka Prasad
 Joe Simon
 Karthik Sharma

Production 
Umashree played a prostitute while Radhika played her daughter.

Soundtrack 

The film's background score is by Rajesh Ramnath and the soundtracks are composed by Raja. The music rights were acquired by Ananda Audio.

Awards

References 

2000s Kannada-language films
2000s romance films
Indian romance films
Films shot in Bangalore
Films directed by Yogaraj Bhat
Films scored by Raja